The Girl and the Press Photographer is a 1963 Danish comedy film directed by Sven Methling and starring Dirch Passer.

Cast
Dirch Passer as Jens August Sebastian 'Bastian' Dusinius
Ghita Nørby as Lene Kristiansen
Paul Hagen as Søren
Judy Gringer as Yvette Salomonsen
Axel Strøbye as Advokat Aksel Gormsen
Ove Sprogøe as Madsen
Bjørn Watt-Boolsen as Oberst Arnold Kristiansen
Bodil Steen as Charlotte Kristiansen
Kirsten Passer as Husholderske
Arthur Jensen as Vicevært
Carl Johan Hviid as Giftefoged
Poul Clemmensen as En portvagt i lufthavnen
Herman Gellin as Sir Thomas Gellinski
Povl Wøldike as Orkesterleder
Bjørn Spiro as Bodyguard for udenlandsk diplomat
Finn Hillingsøe as Bodyguard for udenlandsk diplomat
Albert Watson as Bodyguard for udenlandsk diplomat
Gunnar Strømvad as Bodyguard for udenlandsk diplomat
Holger Vistisen as Bodyguard for udenlandsk diplomat
Ellen Margrethe Stein as Kvinde hvis lejlighed brænder
Aase Werrild as En dame på gaden
Jan Priiskorn-Schmidt as Piccolo
Hanne Borchsenius as Anna Gormsen
Sigrid Horne-Rasmussen as Kvinde i bolignævnet
Jarl Kulle as Professor
Solveig Ersgaard

References

External links

1963 films
1960s Danish-language films
1963 comedy films
Films directed by Sven Methling
Danish comedy films